Atsuoko Suda (born 11 June 1984) is a Japanese woman cricketer. She made her international debut at the 2013 ICC Women's World Twenty20 Qualifier.

References

External links 
 
 Profile at CricHQ

1984 births
Living people
Japanese women cricketers
Sportspeople from Kanagawa Prefecture